The men's shot put event  at the 2001 IAAF World Indoor Championships was held on March 9.

Results

References
Results
Results

Shot
Shot put at the World Athletics Indoor Championships